Mooringsport is an incorporated municipality in the U.S. state of Louisiana, located in Caddo Parish. Part of the Shreveport–Bossier City metropolitan area and located approximately  outside of the principal city of Shreveport, the town of Mooringsport had a population of 748 at the 2020 U.S. census.

History 
Settled by Alabama and North Carolina settlers in 1836, present-day Mooringsport served as a minor economic hub for steamboats transporting cotton. From its continued growth into an established settlement, the Kansas City Southern Railway came through the area.

Geography
Mooringsport is located in western Caddo Parish at  (32.687029, -93.961630), on the south shore of Caddo Lake. Louisiana Highway 1 bypasses the municipality  to the east.

Demographics

In 1920, Mooringsport had a historic high of 992 residents; since then, its population has fluctuated to a low of 709 at the 1950 U.S. census, to 911 in 1980. By 2020, there were 748 people, 257 households, and 140 families in Mooringsport. At the 2000 census, there were 833 people, 334 households, and 228 families.

Reminiscing its historically predominant non-Hispanic white population, the racial and ethnic makeup was 80.19% White American, 17.77% Black and African American, 0.36% American Indian and Alaska Native, 0.36% from other races, and 1.32% from two or more races in 2000. Hispanic or Latino Americans of any race were 0.72% of the population. At the 2020 census and its nationwide reflection of continued diversification, the racial and ethnic makeup was 76.2% non-Hispanic white, 12.43% Black and African American, 0.8% American Indian and Alaska Native, 7.62% from two or more races, and 2.94% Hispanic or Latino American of any race.

Financially, the median income for a household was $32,177 at the 2000 census. The median income for a family was $40,625. Males had a median income of $29,167 versus $21,875 for females. The per capita income for Mooringsport was $14,589. About 9.8% of families and 10.7% of the population were below the poverty line, including 10.7% of those under age 18 and 14.2% of those age 65 or over. At the 2020 American Community Survey, the median household income declined to $21,346 with a mean income of $33,428. Families had a median household income of $33,438 with a mean of $44,989; married-couple families a median income of $53,542; and non-family households a median income of $17,188.

Notable people
 Lead Belly (Huddie William Ledbetter, 1888–1949), singer and guitarist born in Mooringsport
 Earl Holliman, actor, was raised in Mooringsport
 Sam Caldwell, mayor of Shreveport from 1934–1946, born and reared in Mooringsport
 Bill P. Keith, Texas author, lived in Mooringsport while he represented Caddo Parish in the Louisiana State Senate from 1980-1984

References

External links
Mooringsport community website

Villages in Caddo Parish, Louisiana
Villages in Louisiana
Villages in Shreveport – Bossier City metropolitan area